The 2014 Boylesports Irish Greyhound Derby took place during August and September with the final being held on 13 September 2014 at Shelbourne Park. The winner Laughil Blake picked up the first prize of €125,000 that was on offer. 
The competition was sponsored by Boylesports.

Final result 
At Shelbourne Park (over 550 yards):

Distances 
1¾, ¾, short-head, ¾, 3 (lengths)

Competition Race Report 
The Easter Cup champion Skywalker Farloe was the clear 10-1 favourite in the ante-post betting, followed by newcomer Droopys Nidge at 12–1. The mandatory first round resulted in the elimination of 2012 champion Skywalker Puma who finished lame after a long lay-off through injury and Boylesports Hero also  finished lame with a hock injury. The fastest heat winner was Laughil Blake in 29.43.

The James Roche trained Ballyana Foxtrot recorded 29.39 in round two and Cabra Buck, Kereight King, Fiery Splendour and Jaytee Seville were all surprise eliminations. The best third round performance saw Paradise Maverick (Pat Buckley) win his heat in 29.43 and remain unbeaten, in the very next heat Laughil Blake repeated the time and the pair went into the quarter finals as the new market leaders with Mind The Net and Ballymac Vic just behind. The leading British challenger Holdem Spy was eliminated together with Droopys Nidge and Metro Jack.

Ballymac Vic and Vulturi both won their quarter finals but Paradise Maverick's campaign ended. The third quarter final was the hardest on paper in which Laughil Blake won again from Deanridge Pennys and Droopys Ward whilst Mind The Net went out. The fourth And final heat resulted in an impressive performance by Tyrur Sugar Ray who recorded 29.44 defeating Skywalker Farloe by seven lengths.

Laughil Blake comfortably won the first semi-final  with Emers Superstar running on well for second place and Tyrur Sugar Ray claiming the final place to reach a third successive Irish Derby final; the final British challenger Droopys Ward missed out in fourth. The second semi ended with success for Vulturi who caught the leader Borneo, Ballymac Vic took third place to reach a second Irish Derby final.

In the final Laughil Blake deservedly won despite trapping behind Borneo, Ballymac Vic and Tyrur Sugar Ray but he had enough early pace to soon take the lead. Tyrur Sugar Ray was retired to stud soon after the final.

Quarter finals

Semi finals

See also
2014 UK & Ireland Greyhound Racing Year

References

Greyhound Derby
Irish Greyhound Derby
Irish Greyhound Derby
Irish Greyhound Derby